James Richard May   (born 20 July 1934) is a chemical engineer and company director who was the Chief Executive Officer of the Australian Minerals Industry Research Association Limited (AMIRA) between 1968 and 1994. He is also a fellow of a number of chartered institutions and organisations.

Personal life and education 
Jim May was born in Kensington Gardens, Adelaide in 1934 to Eric May and Ellen Miners during the Great Depression. He has two brothers; John and Lynton May.

His ancestors have a history in the mining and metallurgy fields. The May family left Cornwall, England to search for opportunities in the new mines in South Australia including the Burra Copper Mine and later settled in north of Adelaide in the Wallaroo region. His mother’s side of the family, the Miners and Popes also originated from Cornwall however, an  ancestor, Richard Pope travelled extensively to search for work in the United States, South Africa and eventually, Australia, where he and his family settled in Broken Hill in New South Wales. At the time, there was silver, lead and zinc mines operating in the late 19th century. This is recorded in the Richard Pope diaries that are stored in the State Library of Victoria.
Previously, the Mays and Pope’s had been mine managers and mine workers in Cornwall. While, for the Popes, they worked in Southern Ireland and eventually became managers in the Broken Hill Mines in the late 19th century.

May was first educated at Adelaide High School where he boarded for a number of years before graduating in late 1951. He then studied at the University of Adelaide where he completed his Bachelor of Metallurgical and Chemical Engineering in 1958. After completing his bachelor degree, he studied at the University of New South Wales in the School of Chemical Technology. He completed his Master of Science in 1961.

He married Christine Mary May (née Field) on 21 March 1959 and they have two sons and one daughter.

Career

Early career  
May began his career as a metallurgist at Broken Hill South Mine Limited in 1957. In 1958, he moved to the Australian Atomic Energy Commission (AAEC) as an Experimental Officer. He worked there until 1966, predominantly at the HIFAR Lucas Heights Nuclear Reactor. This role led to him working abroad with the United Kingdom Atomic Energy Authority in 1963 and the Oak Ridge National Laboratory in the United States in 1964 and 1965 as a guest scientist. This endeavoured to cooperatively research nuclear technology for power generation, which had earlier investigated in the development of the United States's and United Kingdom's atomic bomb. In 1967, he was appointed Head of the Chemical Engineering Section of the Australian Commission but soon left in 1968 to become the Chief Executive Officer of the Australian Minerals Industry Research Association Ltd (AMIRA).

AMIRA  
In 1968, May became the first permanent CEO of AMIRA at that point, since AMIRA was established in 1959. This organisation became an advisory group for governments around the world that endeavoured to research into developing and managing new technologies and mitigation strategies in the mining and metallurgy fields. He also established a framework where many research bodies globally, could share their information.
After retiring from AMIRA in 1994, May and AMIRA were both jointly awarded the Australian Eureka Museum Price for Industry. In it, describes the work of May in which he, "…pioneered the practice of multi-company sponsored research". This, as a result, brought about significant change in the culture of mineral research in Australia, the award says. “This rigorous approach to research planning and execution provided an exemplary learning experience for a generation of researchers in the CSIRO and the universities”. The impact of this change was particularly measured in the 1990s, where AMIRA began to be regarded as “world leading” and an organisation that managed well the, “…interaction between industry and the research community”. The Australian Mining Hall of Fame described him in 2016 that he is, “Recognised as a leader and driving force for the development and formalisation of collaborative research within the minerals industry, across all technical disciplines, for over 25 years”.

Later career  
For context, in 1952, May joined AusIMM and served on various AusIMM committees throughout the latter half of the 20th century. AusIMM awarded him the Institute Medal in 1992 and named him the Distinguished Lecturer to the USA in 1995.
In this time, May had been a board member of multiple Cooperative Research Centres including the Centre for Mining Technology and Equipment at the University of Queensland. He has also been Director of the Australian Minerals and Energy Environment Foundation. He has worked in advisory committees for many university departments and several divisions of the CSIRO and the Australian Centre for Minesite Rehabilitation Research. In addition to these, he was also a board member of the Scientific Advisory Committee as well as CSR Limited (Rio Tinto Limited) in the 1990s. Moreover, he also had an important role in the success of the Julius Kruttschnitt Mineral Research Centre (JKMRC). May had a long-standing collaborative relationship with Alban Lynch. He also had a close association with the Sir James Foots School of Mineral Resources at The University of Queensland and the Sir Ian Wark Research Institute with John Ralston at the University of South Australia. May has also been a member of the Australian Research Council as a committee member that reviewed several programs before his retirement.
Upon retiring, May was invited by AusIMM to lecture about his works with AusIMM at various mining engineering institutes throughout the United States in 1995. This is where he received an honourary award as the ‘distinguished lecturer’ from AusIMM and the American Institute of Mining, Metallurgical, and Petroleum Engineers (AIME).

Honours, awards and memberships 
 1952: Member of the Australasian Institute of Mining and Metallurgy
 1992: The Institute Medal of the Australasian Institute of Mining and Metallurgy
 “In recognition of his outstanding contribution to the initiation and management of mineral research and technology through his role as Chief Executive Officer of AMIRA and involvement with research organisations throughout Australia.”
 1993: Honorary Doctorate of the University of South Australia (Hon. DUniv)
 1994: Honorary Doctorate of the University of Queensland (Hon. DPhil)
 1994: Fellow of the Australian Academy of Technological Sciences and Engineering (FTSE)
 1994: The Australian Museum Prize for Industry
 1995: The AusIMM and AIME Distinguished Lecturer
 2001: Centenary Medal, 1 January 2001, 
 “For service to Australian society in mineral science and engineering”
 2016: The Australian Prospectors and Mining Hall of Fame Award
 2021: Honorary Fellow of the Australasian Institute of Mining and Metallurgy (HonFAusIMM)

References 

1934 births
Living people
Australian chemical engineers
Australian business executives
Australian corporate directors
Scientists from Adelaide 
Scientists from Melbourne 
Australian metallurgists
Fellows of the Australian Academy of Technological Sciences and Engineering
University of Adelaide alumni
University of New South Wales alumni
Recipients of the Centenary Medal